Olena Krasovska, née Ovcharova (born 17 August 1976, Kyiv) is a Ukrainian hurdler best known for winning a silver medal at the 2004 Olympic Games with a personal best time of 12.45 seconds.

Career
She was born in Kyiv, and represents the sports club Dynamo Kyiv. In her early career she won the bronze medal in 60 metres hurdles at the 2000 European Indoor Championships. She also competed at the 1995 World Championships, the 1996 Olympic Games, the 1997 World Indoor Championships, the 1998 European Championships, the 2000 Olympic Games, the 2001 World Indoor Championships and the 2001 World Championships without reaching the final. She ran in 12.88 seconds as early as in June 1995 in Villeneuve-d'Ascq, but did not improve this time until August 2000 in Kyiv, when she ran in 12.82 seconds. In 2001, she ran in 12.87 seconds in Seville in June. Also, in the 4 x 100 metres relay she competed at the 2000 Olympic Games without reaching the final.

In 2002, she won the silver medal at the 2002 European Championships, finished eighth at the IAAF Grand Prix Final and fourth at the 2002 IAAF World Cup. She came close to setting a new personal best with 12.85 seconds in June 2002 in Luzern. but 2003 was a substantially weaker year with only 13.06 seconds. She competed at the 2003 World Championships without reaching the final. In 2004, she won the European Cup competition in Bydgoszcz, clocking in 12.78 seconds, before winning the silver medal at the 2004 Olympic Games with a personal best time of 12.45 seconds. She only finished fifth at the 2004 World Athletics Final. In the next year she reached the semi-final of the 2005 World Championships, and had a season's best of 12.75. She has not run a sub-13 second hurdles race since, but came close with 13.01 seconds at DN Galan in 2008 and 13.00 seconds in Yalta in June 2009.

12.45 seconds puts Krasovska in a joint 18th place on the all-time world list. It is also the fastest time achieved by a hurdler representing Ukraine—yet she does not hold the Ukrainian record, as the Ukrainian record holder Nataliya Grygoryeva achieved her time of 12.39 seconds whilst representing the Soviet Union. Other personal bests include 8.01 seconds in the 60 metres hurdles (indoor), achieved in February 2000 in Kyiv; 7.35 seconds in the 60 metres (indoor), achieved in January 2001 in Kyiv; and 11.53 seconds in the 100 metres, achieved in May 2002 in Kiev. She jumped 6.52 metres in the long jump, indoor, in February 1999 in Lviv.

References

1976 births
Living people
Ukrainian female hurdlers
Ukrainian female sprinters
Athletes (track and field) at the 1996 Summer Olympics
Athletes (track and field) at the 2000 Summer Olympics
Athletes (track and field) at the 2004 Summer Olympics
Olympic athletes of Ukraine
Sportspeople from Kyiv
Dynamo sports society athletes
European Athletics Championships medalists
Medalists at the 2004 Summer Olympics
Olympic silver medalists for Ukraine
Olympic silver medalists in athletics (track and field)
Universiade medalists in athletics (track and field)
Universiade silver medalists for Ukraine
20th-century Ukrainian women
21st-century Ukrainian women